The Anatoki River is a river of New Zealand. It is located in the Tasman Region, and is a tributary of the Tākaka River and is one of the country's steepest rivers. The river's name means cave of stone adzes.

See also
List of rivers of New Zealand

References

Land Information New Zealand - Search for Place Names

Rivers of the Tasman District
Rivers of New Zealand